Sinhala words of Tamil origin came about as part of the more than 2000 years of language interactions between Sinhala and Tamil in the island of Sri Lanka, as well as through Dravidian substratum effect on the Sinhala language. According to linguists, there are about 900 Tamil words in Sinhala usage.

Sinhala is classified as an Indo-Aryan language and Tamil is classified as a Dravidian language. Separated from its sister Indo-Aryan languages such as Hindi and Bengali by a large belt of Dravidian languages, Sinhala along with Dhivehi of the Maldives evolved somewhat separately.

Close interaction with the Tamil language and the assimilation of Tamils into Sinhalese society contributed to the adoption of several Tamil origin words into the Sinhalese language. The range of borrowings goes beyond the scope to be expected for a situation where two neighbouring peoples exchange material goods: Firstly, there are many Tamil loanwords pertaining to everyday and social life (kinship terms, body parts, ordinary activities). Secondly, several lexical words (nouns, adjectives and verbs)  along with interjections (ayiyō), (aḍō) have also been borrowed. This - along with the impact Tamil has had on Sinhala syntax (e.g. the use of a verbal adjective of "to say" as a subordinating conjunction meaning "whether" and "that") - is suggestive of not only close coexistence but the existence of large numbers of bilinguals and a high degree of mixing and intermarriage.

Kinds of loanwords
Borrowings
The words pertaining to the fields of commerce, administration, botany, food and military are the most numerous; this is to be expected because
new innovations and goods usually reached the Sinhalese via the Tamils whose area of settlement separates them from the rest of South Asia and
Tamil speaking traders conducted most of the island's foreign trade since the 10th century AD. This is attested by multiple Tamil inscriptions in Sri Lanka left by medieval trade guilds.

The borrowing process
Tamil loanwords in Sinhala can appear in the same form as the original word (e.g. akkā), but this is quite rare. Usually, a word has undergone some kind of modification to fit into the Sinhala phonological (e.g. paḻi becomes paḷi(ya) because the sound of /ḻ/, does not exist in the Sinhala phoneme inventory) or morphological system (e.g. ilakkam becomes ilakkama because Sinhala inanimate nouns (see grammatical gender) need to end with /a/, in order to be declineable).

These are the main ways Tamil words are incorporated into the Sinhala lexicon with different endings:
With an /a/ added to Tamil words ending in /m/ and other consonants (e.g. pālam > pālama).
With a /ya/ or /va/ added to words ending in vowels (e.g. araḷi > araliya).
With the Tamil ending /ai/ represented as /ē/, commonly spelt /aya/.
With the animate ending /yā/ added to Tamil words signifying living beings or /yā/ replacing the Tamil endings /aṉ/, /ar/, etc. (e.g. caṇṭiyar > caṇḍiyā).

It can be observed that the Tamil phonemes /ḷ/ and /ḻ/ do not coherently appear as /ḷ/ in Sinhala but sometimes as /l/ as well. This is because in Sinhala pronunciation there is no distinction between /ḷ/ and /l/; the letter /ḷ/ is merely maintained as an etymological spelling.

Time of borrowing
In many cases, the appearance of a loanword in a language indicates whether the borrowing is old or more recent: The more a word deviates from the "original" one, the longer it must have been a part of the respective lexicon, because while being used, a word can undergo changes (sometimes regular sound changes along with the native words). The inversion of this argument is not possible since loanwords already matching the linguistic requirements of the target language may remain unchanged. Thus, the word täpäl (Tamil tapāl) gives away its old age because the respective umlaut processes took place before the 8th century; iḍama (Tamil iṭam) however needn't be a recent borrowing, because no sound changes that could have affected this word have taken place in Sinhala since at least the 13th century.

List of words

In the following list, Tamil words are romanized in accordance with Tamil spelling. This results in seeming discrepancies in voicing between Sinhala words and their Tamil counterparts. Sinhala borrowing however has taken place on the basis of the sound of the Tamil words; thus, the word ampalam, logically results in the Sinhala spelling ambalama, and so forth.  However, the Tamil language used here for comparison is Tamil as spoken in Sri Lanka.

Note: For information on the transcription used, see National Library at Calcutta romanization and Tamil script. Exceptions from the standard are the romanization of Sinhala long "ä" as "ää", and the non-marking of prenasalized stops.

Verbs

Several verbs have been adopted into Sinhala from the Tamil language. The vast majority of these are compound verbs consisting of a Tamil origin primary verb and a Sinhala origin light verb.

See also
 Dutch loanwords in Sinhala
 English loanwords in Sinhala
 Portuguese loanwords in Sinhala

References

 Coperahewa, Sandagomi and Arunachalam,Sarojini Devi Sinhala Bhashave Demala Vacana Akaradiya[Dictionary of Tamil Words in Sinhala] (Colombo: S.Godage, 2002).

Geiger, Wilhelm: Linguistic Character of Sinhalese, in: Journal of the Royal Asiatic Society (Ceylon), Vol. XXXIV
Gunasekara, A.M.: A Comprehensive Grammar of the Sinhalese Language, Colombo 1891 (reprint New Delhi 1986),  (§234: Naturalised and derived words from Tamil)

External links
Sinhala Tamil online dictionary
Tamil Sinhala online dictionary
Article on Sanskritisms in Sinhala (partly based on opinion)

Sinhala
Sri Lanka-related lists
Lists of Sinhala words of foreign origin